Notre-Dame-de-Grâce, also nicknamed NDG, is a residential neighbourhood of Montreal in the city's West End, with a population of 166,520 (2016). An independent municipality until annexed by the City of Montreal in 1910, NDG is today one half of the borough of Côte-des-Neiges–Notre-Dame-de-Grâce. It comprises two wards, Loyola to the west and Notre-Dame-de-Grâce to the east. NDG is bordered by four independent enclaves; its eastern border is shared with the City of Westmount, Quebec, to the north and west it is bordered by the cities of Montreal West, Hampstead and Côte-Saint-Luc. NDG plays a pivotal role in serving as the commercial and cultural hub for Montreal's predominantly English-speaking West End, with Sherbrooke Street West running the length of the community as the main commercial artery. The community is roughly bounded by Claremont Avenue to the east, Côte-Saint-Luc Road to the north, Brock Avenue in the west, and Highway 20 and the Saint-Jacques Escarpment to the south.

History

At the time of Montreal's founding in 1642 most of the land stretching past Mount Royal to the northwest was a vast forest running the length of a long, narrow ridge known as the Saint Jacques Escarpment. The area that was to become Notre-Dame-de-Grâce was founded along that ridge, near a since-drained Lac Saint-Pierre. The first Europeans settled the area eight years after the founding of the colony of Ville Marie, on November 18, 1650. They were Jean Descarries (or Descaris) dit le Houx and Jean Leduc, from Igé, Perche, France.

Both settlers received  of land in Notre-Dame-de-Grâce, a vast territory that stretched from what would become Atwater Avenue to Lachine. The eastern part of the territory split off in 1874 as the village of Côte-Saint-Antoine, later renamed Westmount; a section then split off the western edge in 1897 to become Montreal West.

In 1853, construction of the Church of Notre-Dame-de-Grâce was completed.

In December 1876, the Municipality of the Village of Notre-Dame-de-Grâce was established through proclamation. In 1906, the village of Notre-Dame-de-Grâce was incorporated as a town. On June 4, 1910, Notre-Dame-de-Grâce was annexed to the city of Montreal.

It was during this period that the long-established Descarries family reached its peak. Daniel-Jérémie Décarie (1836-1904) was mayor of Notre-Dame-de-Grâce from 1877 to 1904 and his son, lawyer Jérémie-Louis Décarie (1870-1927), was a Quebec parliamentarian.

In May 1912, Décarie Boulevard was officially designated, running north–south from Côte-des-Neiges and the Town of Mount Royal in the north to Saint-Henri and Côte-Saint-Paul in the south (a section of the road was already known as Décarie Avenue).

In 1908, the first tramway made its appearance in Notre-Dame-de-Grâce, running around the north side of Mount Royal from Snowdon Station to the intersection of Mount Royal and Parc avenues.

Gradually the village developed around the Church of Notre-Dame-de-Grâce which was the head church of the seven parishes on the western part of the Island of Montreal.

It was around 1920 that Anglophones began settling in NDG, resulting in the construction of numerous schools and churches. The Décarie Expressway opened to motorists in 1966, in time for Expo 67.

Since 2002, the area has been administratively attached to Côte-des-Neiges as the borough of Côte-des-Neiges–Notre-Dame-de-Grâce.

Geography
Notre-Dame-de-Grâce is bounded on the east by the border with Westmount and Côte-des-Neiges, the south by the Saint-Jacques Escarpment, and the north by Côte-Saint-Luc Road, extending west to the border with Montreal West.

Westmount Adjacent area
"Westmount Adjacent" is a term applied by realtors to a district along the eastern edge of Notre-Dame-de-Grâce, located in between the city of Westmount to the east, the Décarie Expressway to the west, De Maisonneuve Boulevard to the south, and the lands of Villa Maria private Catholic girls school to the north. Both of Notre-Dame-de-Grâce's metro stations, Vendôme and Villa-Maria, are located in the area.

The construction of the Décarie Expressway forced the displacement of 285 families and had a major impact on the neighbourhood, severing the easternmost part from the whole and leading to the area being referred to as Westmount Adjacent — a term implying housing costs and lifestyles more on par with Westmount, one of the most affluent communities in North America, rather than NDG which as a whole is more middle income.

Demographics

Broadly speaking Notre-Dame-de-Grâce is a middle class first-ring residential suburb with a culturally and linguistically diverse urban population. The cityscape and history of the community is rooted firmly in NDG's role as a home for an upwardly-mobile French Canadian middle class that developed much of the land roughly between Confederation and the First World War. The neighbourhood is characterized by traditional Quebecois housing styles - notably the detached or semidetached duplex - as well as being organized along the historic land division system developed by for agricultural purposes during Quebec's colonial period (i.e. long, rectangular city blocks running perpendicular to a river or ridge). It is a predominantly residential neighbourhood with considerable appeal to a wide variety of Montrealers, owing principally to its local cultural cachet, proximity to the urban core of the city, and wide variety of commercial and public services.

NDG is a community of communities, as there are several somewhat distinct neighbourhoods within it. Officially the community is divided into an eastern and western ward with Cavendish Boulevard serving as the bisecting line. The eastern part of Notre-Dame-de-Grâce is itself split in two parts by the Décarie Expressway (running north–south), which was built in the late 1950s and resulted in the destruction of many hundreds of homes. The eastern ward is focused around the parish church at the intersection of Décarie and Notre-Dame-de-Grâce avenue, with many of the neighbourhood's oldest buildings being found nearby. Owing to its history, the eastern ward is primarily francophone, middle class and has a strong French and Quebecois cultural and aesthetic character.

The western ward developed during the interwar and post-WW2 era and is more varied in terms of housing styles, income levels, cultural representation and spoken languages. Generally speaking NDG is associated with Montreal's multi-ethnic middle-class Anglophone community, given the presence of major Anglophone institutions like Loyola College of Concordia University and the MUHC super-hospital, but despite this association many residents are bilingual in French and English and speak both on a regular, if not daily, basis.

Affordable housing and proximity to major Anglophone post-secondary educational institutions, particularly Dawson College and Concordia University, has resulted in a large and consistent student population residing in NDG.

The visible minority population of the neighbourhood is 33%, with the ethnic breakdown of the neighbourhood varied over the territory of NDG.

There is also a sizeable Afro-Canadian and immigrant community, concentrated mostly around the parts of the district north of Somerled Avenue as well as south of Sherbrooke Street, and a 'Little Italy' located south of the Canadian Pacific line, colloquially referred to as Saint Raymond. Saint Raymond, with a population of 5 915, has a black population of 18% and a Chinese population of 12%, both notably higher than Montreal as a whole.  In recent years, Notre-Dame-de-Grâce has developed into a highly desirable neighbourhood for young professionals, though little gentrification has occurred outside of the Monkland Village.

Cityscape

Geographically NDG is situated on a long plateau extending southwest from Mount Royal, cascading in wide terraces down from Côte-Saint-Luc Road ( being the French word for ridge) towards the far steeper Saint-Jacques Escarpment. The land is divided, as is traditional in Quebec, in long narrow strips, an evolution of the seigneurial land division system of the province's colonial era. Thus, NDG has many avenues running north-south, but far fewer running east-west. As such, the community is characterized by several prominent boulevards where commercial activity is concentrated. This design element also traces its history back to the earliest urban design planning native to Canada.

NDG is almost exclusively residential and institutional in nature, defined in part by major Anglophone civic institutions anchoring its eastern and western ends. These are the MUHC hospital at the Glen Yards, adjacent to the Vendome intermodal station and the Loyola campus of Concordia University (situated next to the Montreal-West commuter rail station, respectively). Public schools, libraries, places of worship, parks, playgrounds, and public athletic facilities, including a local chapter of the Montreal YMCA, are distributed throughout the area. Housing tends towards the antique, with much of the construction occurring between 1910 and 1940 and providing a unique mix of Art Nouveau, Art Deco, and Beaux-Arts influences on traditional Quebecois architectural styles. There a variety of housing styles found in the borough, though the dominant and favoured style remains the red brick duplex row-house. Adding to its residential appeal, the community is well known for its tree-lined streets and general walkability.

An important housing project is situated near the geographical centre of NDG on Cavendish Boulevard, which bisects the borough into its eastern and western halves. The Benny Farm housing project was built to serve the needs of veterans returning from Second World War service, though was later designated as subsidized housing. The housing and surrounding landscaping was rehabilitated in the early 2000s, with new low-cost housing and additional public facilities built, such as the Benny Farm CLSC (a community centre with many social services including a clinic run by the provincial health ministry).

The Décarie Expressway trench and the mainline of the Canadian Pacific railway each forms barriers that arguably disrupt the cohesiveness of the borough. As such, sections of NDG have unique characteristics and be characterized as well-defined neighbourhoods. As an example, the sliver of NDG running between the rail line and the Saint-Jacques Escarpment (from Cavendish Boulevard to the Décarie Expressway) is known as St. Raymond's and has a strong association with Montreal's Italian community. Another section, separated from the rest of NDG by a highway trench and sharing a border with Westmount, is closer to where the village of Notre-Dame-de-Grâce was founded, and as such is occasionally referred to as 'Old NDG'.

NDG first rose to prominence as an important middle-class suburb towards the end of the 19th century, initially populated by the (then) new white-collar workforce of the Canadian metropolis and accessible via tramways running to and from the city centre. As widespread suburbanization developed in the post-WW2 period, NDG became home to successive waves of immigrants, first from Eastern Europe (including a sizeable Jewish population), then from the Caribbean, and more recently from Africa, the Middle East, and Southeast Asia. Concurrently, Anglophone Montrealers consolidated in the West End broadly speaking, with Montreal's Irish and Black communities shifting away from their traditional neighbourhoods (Griffintown and Little Burgundy respectively) and taking a more prominent position within the demographics of the area.

Today NDG is a cosmopolitan mixed-income urban neighbourhood highly sought after by young professionals. The multitude of services, including parks and other green spaces, schools, clinics, and major institutions, make it an ideal neighbourhood to raise a family close to the centre of the city of Montreal and its Central Business District. The vintage and antique housing is generally well kept and the aesthetic of the early 20th-century first-ring suburb has been preserved. Additionally, NDG is well-served by public transit, including numerous bus lines, two Métro, and two commuter train stations, allowing the area to be one of the most 'walkable' in the entire city.

Sports and recreation
NDG is well known for many large parks including NDG Park (known as Girouard Park), Loyola Park, Trenholme Park, Benny Park, Somerled Park, and Parc de la Confédération. The area has three indoor hockey arenas: the public Doug Harvey Arena (formerly Confederation Arena) and the private Lower Canada College High School and Concordia University (Ed Meagher Arena) rinks. NDG is also home to the NDG YMCA, which includes a pool, gym, and recreation programs for youth and adults.

The community is home to several sports organizations for both children and adults, with NDG Hockey and NDG Baseball being the most well-known and respected organizations. NDG Baseball joined Baseball Québec in 2022 after many years and several championships as part of Little League Quebec.

NDG is home to the Montreal Exiles Rugby Football club (www.montrealexiles.com) who have mini-rugby teams (NDG Dragons) at U-6, U-8, U-10 U-12 and U-14 levels, Junior rugby at U-18 and senior men's rugby. Founded in 2011, the senior men's side featured in the provincial finals in 2011, losing to Westmount in the semi-final, and again in 2012 winning the Division C league and Cup. Their home field is Confederation Park.

Transportation

The public transport agency that operates transit bus and rapid transit services in Montreal is the Société de transport de Montréal (STM).

Rapid transit
The orange line of Montreal's Metro runs through the borough, following the Décarie Expressway with Villa Maria and Vendôme located on the eastern side of the autoroute trench.

NDG is also served by a variety of STM bus lines offering various service levels:

10-minute maximum (6:00-21:00)
 24 Sherbrooke: East-West local bus serving Décarie Boulevard in NDG, Villa Maria metro station is its western terminus.
 51 Edouard-Montpetit: East-West local bus serving Fielding Avenue. Montreal-Ouest commuter rail station is its western terminus. 
 105 Sherbrooke: East-West local bus serving Sherbrooke street in NDG. Montreal-Ouest commuter rail station and Vendôme metro station are its western and eastern termini, respectively. 
10-minute maximum (6:00-14:00 East)(14:00-21:00 West)

 90 Saint-Jacques: East-west local bus serving Saint-Jacques Boulevard in NDG. Connections with Vendôme metro station.
 103 Monkland: East-West local bus serving Monkland, Grand Boulevard in NDG. Villa Maria metro station serves as its eastern terminus. 
Local (day)
 17 Décarie: North-South local bus serving Girouard Boulevard in NDG. Connections with Vendôme metro station.
 63 Girouard: North-South local bus serving Girouard Boulevard in NDG.
 102 Somerled: East-West local bus serving Somerled Avenue in NDG. Its eastern terminus is Vendôme metro station.
 104 Cavendish: East-West local bus serving Cavendish Boulevard in NDG. Connections with Vendôme metro station.
 138 Notre-Dame-de-Grâce: East-West local bus serving Notre-Dame-de-Grâce and Cavendish in NDG. 
 162 Westminster: East-West local bus serving Monkland Avenue in NDG. Its eastern terminus is Villa Maria metro station.
Express (day)
 420 Notre-Dame-De-Grâce Express: Commuter express bus that stops along Cavendish Boulevard and Sherbrooke before it goes to Downtown Montreal. 
All night
 356: Night bus that serves Sherbrooke street in NDG. Operates from 2:30 a.m. and 5:00 a.m.

Streetscape
The major commercial streets are Monkland Avenue, Somerled Avenue and Sherbrooke Street West. Monkland Village comprises a cluster of businesses on the eastern part of Monkland Avenue that was revitalized in the 1990s. The Décarie Expressway is a major sunken urban highway that runs north–south and splits eastern NDG into two segments. Several bridges connect both sides of the borough for both vehicles and pedestrians.

Street names
The following is a list of street names in the area and what/who they're named after:

 Trenholme Street named after the founder of Elmhurst Dairy Thomas Anderson Trenholme
 Bessborough: Vere Ponsonby, 9th Earl of Bessborough, 14th Governor General of Canada
 Borden: Robert Borden, 8th Prime Minister of Canada
 Cavendish: Most likely the British House of Cavendish
 Connaught: Prince Arthur, Duke of Connaught and Strathearn, 10th Governor General of Canada
 Décarie: One or many of several prominent members of the Décarie family; possibly specifically Jérémie-Louis Décarie, who was born in NDG
 Fielding: William Stevens Fielding, 7th Premier of Nova Scotia and federal Minister of Finance, editor Montreal Daily Telegraph
 Girouard: Désiré Girouard, Canadian lawyer, politician, and Puisne Justice of the Supreme Court of Canada
 Hingston: William Hales Hingston, a Canadian senator & Mayor of Montreal
 Marcil: Georges Marcil, last mayor of NDG before its annexation into the city of Montreal.
 Monkland: James Monk, former Chief Justice of Lower Canada; landowner
 Notre-Dame-de-Grâce: NDG — the community in which the street is situated
 Old Orchard: The orchards that used to make up large parts of modern-day NDG;
 Sherbrooke: John Coape Sherbrooke, Governor General of British North America, circa 1816
 Somerled: 12th-century Scottish leader
 Terrebonne: A French seigniory near what is now the city of Terrebonne
Wilson: Named for former Montreal mayor Charles Wilson

Education

The Commission scolaire de Montréal (CSDM) operates Francophone public schools.

The administrative offices of the English Montreal School Board (ESMB), which operates Anglophone public schools in this borough, are located in Notre-Dame-de-Grâce. The EMSB operates 40 primaries, 17 secondaries and 32 other learning institutions with a total student population of 38,000.

There are numerous private and public educational institutions within the community:

Elementary schools
French schools (CSDM)
 École internationale de Montréal (primaire)
 École Marc-Favreau
 L'Étoile Filante
 École Notre-Dame-de-Grâce
 École Anne-Hébert
 École Rudolph-Steiner de Montreal

English Schools
 Royal Vale
 Willingdon School
 Herbert Symonds (Closed 1981)
 St. Monica School

High schools
Private
Centennial Academy
Greaves Adventist Academy
Lower Canada College
Loyola High School
Villa Maria
Kells Academy
Public 
Marymount Academy
Royal Vale School (K-11)
West Hill High School (Montreal)(closed 1992)
Ecole Saint-Luc

Universities
Concordia University (Loyola Campus)

Public libraries
The Montreal Public Libraries Network operates libraries.

Notable residents

Actors, musicians, artists
Jay Baruchel, actor
Constance Beresford-Howe, writer
Anne Dorval, actress
Ida Haendel, violinist
Corky Laing, drummer
Irving Layton, poet
Laurence Leboeuf, actress
Émile Ollivier (writer), writer
Jessica Paré, actress
Michel Rivard, French Canadian singer
William Shatner, actor

Athletes and sports officials/personalities
Steven Fletcher (ice hockey), NHL player
Frank Greenleaf, president of the Canadian and Quebec Amateur Hockey Associations
Doug Harvey, former NHL player
Fleming Mackell, former NHL player
Russell Martin, major league baseball catcher
Jim McKean, former CFL player and MLB umpire
Ian Mofford, former CFL player and Grey Cup champion
Sergio Momesso, former NHL player and current sports commentator
Gabriel Morency, sports-talk radio personality
Sam Pollock, General Manager; Montreal Canadiens
Marco Scandella, NHL player

Geographic location

See also
Oxford Park, Montreal

References

External links

 Borough of Côte-des-Neiges–Notre-Dame-de-Grâce

Neighbourhoods in Montreal
Côte-des-Neiges–Notre-Dame-de-Grâce